The siege of Bonn may refer to:

 Siege of Bonn (1583), part of the Cologne War
 Siege of Bonn (1588), part of the Cologne War
 Siege of Bonn (1673), part of the Franco-Dutch War
 Siege of Bonn (1689), part of the War of the Grand Alliance
 Siege of Bonn (1703), part of the War of the Spanish Succession